The McGrigor Baronetcy, of Campden Hill in the County of Middlesex, is a title in the Baronetage of the United Kingdom. It was created on 30 September 1831 for James McGrigor. He was a military surgeon and for many years Director-General of the Army Medical Department. Charles Rhoderick McGrigor (1860–1927), second son of the second Baronet, was a Major-General in the Army and the father of Admiral of the Fleet Sir Rhoderick McGrigor. The sixth Baronet is a Conservative politician.

McGrigor baronets, of Campden Hill (1831)
Sir James McGrigor, 1st Baronet (1771–1858)
Sir Charles Rhoderic McGrigor, 2nd Baronet (1811–1890)
Sir James Rhoderic Duff McGrigor, 3rd Baronet (1857–1924)
Sir Charles Colquhoun McGrigor, 4th Baronet (1893–1946) 
Sir Charles Edward McGrigor, 5th Baronet (1922–2007) m. the author Mary McGrigor, daughter of Sir Archibald Charles Edmonstone of Duntreath, 6th Baronet.
Sir James Angus Rhoderick McGrigor, 6th Baronet (born 1949)

The heir apparent to the baronetcy is Alexander James Edward Lyon McGrigor (born 1998), only son of the 6th Baronet.

Notes

References
Kidd, Charles, Williamson, David (editors). Debrett's Peerage and Baronetage (1990 edition). New York: St Martin's Press, 1990, 

Baronetcies in the Baronetage of the United Kingdom